Fang or "Wiang Fang" ("wiang" is a walled city or town) is a town in the northern Chiang Mai Province, Thailand, also known as Thesaban Wiang Fang, the capital of Fang District. It is 154 km north of Chiang Mai, among the highest mountains in the country.

History 
According to the Yonok chronicle, Mueang Fang was built in 641 by King Lawa Changkarat. Later King Mengrai the Great reigned in Fang before building Wiang Kum Kam and Chiang Mai of the Lanna Kingdom for one year around 1268. It seems that Mengrai used Mueang Fang for the base to invade Hariphunchai.

Etymology
The landscape of Fang looked like the seed of a fang tree (Caesalpinia sappan). The town was named after the tree.

Geography
Neighboring districts are (from the south clockwise) Mu 1, 10 Tambon San Sai, Mu 7 (Ban Mea Jai) Tambon Wiang, Mu 2, 4 Tambon Wiang, and Mu 2 Tambon Wiang.

Administration 
The town is subdivided into 12 boroughs ("chumchon"), which include five villages (muban) of the Wiang subdistrict - Mu 2, 3, 4, 5, and 9.

Education 
The school structure is divided into four key stages: the first three years in elementary school, Prathom 1–3, are for ages 6–8; the second level, Prathom 4–6 are for children 9–11; the third level, Matthayom 1–3, is for ages 12–14. The upper secondary level of schooling consists of Matthayom 4–6 for ages 15–17 and is divided into academic and vocational streams. There are academic upper secondary schools, vocational upper secondary schools, and comprehensive schools offering academic and vocational tracks. Students who choose the academic stream usually intend to enter a university. Vocational schools offer programs that prepare students for employment.

Secondary school (Prathom 1 – Matthayom 3)
 Ban Wiang Fang School (public)
 Saiaksorn School (private)

High school (Prathom 1–Matthayom 6)
Rangsee Vittaya School (Christian school)

Technical college
Thana Technology International College Chiang Mai (private)

Climate 
Fang has a tropical wet and dry climate (Köppen climate classification Aw). Winters are fairly dry and warm. The monsoon season runs from late-April through October, with heavy rain and somewhat cooler temperatures during the day, although nights remain warm.

See also 
 Fang District
 Fangchanupathum School
 Chai Prakan

References

External links

Cities and towns in Thailand
Populated places in Chiang Mai province
Cities and towns in Chiang Mai province